The Point Judith Light is located on the west side of the entrance to Narragansett Bay, Rhode Island as well as the north side of the eastern entrance to Block Island Sound. The confluence of two waterways make this area busy with water traffic and the waters around Point Judith are very cold and dangerous.  Historically, even with active lighthouses, there have been many shipwrecks off these coasts.

Three light structures have been built on this site.  The original  tower, built in 1810, was destroyed by a hurricane in 1815.  It was replaced in 1816, by another 35-foot stone tower with a revolving light and ten lamps.  The present octagonal granite tower was built in 1856. The upper half of the tower is painted brown and the lower half white to make the light structure a more effective daymark for maritime traffic.  In 1871, ship captains asked that Point Judith's fog signal be changed from a horn to whistle.  This change distinguished the Point Judith light from the Beavertail Lighthouse, which used a siren to announce fog.  A whistle could also be heard more distinctly over the sounds of the surf in the area.  Point Judith Light was automated in 1954, and was listed on the National Register of Historic Places in 1988.

See also
National Register of Historic Places listings in Washington County, Rhode Island

Cobra Kai, Season 5: Episode 4

References

External links

NPS - Historic light stations - Point Judith Light

Lighthouses in Washington County, Rhode Island
Buildings and structures in Narragansett, Rhode Island
Narragansett Bay
Lighthouses on the National Register of Historic Places in Rhode Island
National Register of Historic Places in Washington County, Rhode Island
Lighthouses completed in 1810
Lighthouses completed in 1816
Lighthouses completed in 1856
Octagonal buildings in the United States
1816 establishments in Rhode Island
1856 establishments in Rhode Island